John Hopkins (died 1615) was an English politician who sat in the House of Commons in 1601.

Hopkins was a merchant of Bristol. He was an Alderman and became Sheriff in 1586 and Mayor in 1600. In 1601, he was elected Member of Parliament for Bristol.

See also
Politics of the United Kingdom

References

Year of birth missing
1615 deaths
English MPs 1601
Mayors of Bristol
English merchants
High Sheriffs of Bristol
Place of birth missing
17th-century merchants